Kláštor pod Znievom is a village and municipality in Martin District in the Žilina Region of northern Slovakia, south west from Martin, near the Malá Fatra mountains.

History
In historical records the village was first mentioned in 1113. Its castle Zniev was built by Andrew Hont-Pázmány. From 1242 to 1249 the castle was the seat of king Béla IV of Hungary. Around the half of the 13th century, the settlement got town privileges as the first one in the Turiec region, but it lost them in 1666 during at the times of reformation and counter-reformation.
In the second half of the 19th century, Kláštor pod Znievom became one of the centres of Slovak national movement, as one of three Slovak high schools was opened here in 1869, but was closed down in 1874 as a result of the Magyarization policy.

Geography
The municipality lies at an altitude of 500 metres and covers an area of 39.029 km². It has a population of about 1577 people.

People
Alexander Moyzes, composer

See also
 List of municipalities and towns in Slovakia

References

Genealogical resources

The records for genealogical research are available at the state archive "Statny Archiv in Bytca, Slovakia"

 Roman Catholic church records (births/marriages/deaths): 1653-1896 (parish A)
 Lutheran church records (births/marriages/deaths): 1783-1928 (parish B)

External links
Official website 
Surnames of living people in Klastor pod Znievom

Villages and municipalities in Martin District